New Hunwick is a village in County Durham, in England. It is situated to the north of Bishop Auckland, joined with the older village of Hunwick. This area of Hunwick grew up around the industrialisation of County Durham.

References 

Villages in County Durham
Crook, County Durham